The Albatros B.III, (post-war company designation L.5), was a German World War I reconnaissance biplane, built by Albatros Flugzeugwerke as the Albatros LDD.

Development and design
The Albatros B.III was the last of the company's unarmed reconnaissance two-seaters and was a precursor to the most important of their armed reconnaissance biplanes, the C.III.

The changes from the previous versions were fairly minor. It introduced what would become the typical Albatros tail when the rudder was rounded off. It was otherwise similar to the B.II. The B.III was produced in small numbers during 1915, but it was already clear that reconnaissance aircraft needed to be armed. Albatros then produced the C.I, which was based on the earlier B.II, and then moved onto the C.III. With some additional detail changes the Albatros C.III was basically an armed version of the B.III, although few parts remained interchangeable between the two aircraft.

Operational history

Variants
Albatros L.5 - post-war manufacturers' retroactive designation

Operators

Luftstreitkräfte
Kaiserliche Marine

Austro-Hungarian Imperial and Royal Aviation Troops

Units using this aircraft
FEA 6

Specifications

See also

References

Bibliography

 

Biplanes
Single-engined tractor aircraft
1910s German military reconnaissance aircraft
Military aircraft of World War I
B.III
Aircraft first flown in 1915